Caulfield railway station is a commuter railway station on the northern boundary of Caulfield East, a suburb of Melbourne, Victoria, Australia. Opened in 1879 and rebuilt from 1913 to 1914, the station complex is listed on the Victorian Heritage Register and is noted as an example of Federation Free Style architecture. It is named after the nearby suburb of Caulfield, located southwest of the station. 

The station consists of an island platform and two side platforms, all accessed by a pedestrian underpass. There are three principal station buildings located on the platforms, including a small brick building located on Platform 1, near the main platform building. This building was provided in 1974 and originally served as a ticket office for the Caulfield Racecourse, which is directly adjacent. The station complex also features a rare "horse platform" used when horses were delivered to the racecourse. The station is only partially accessible due to a steep access ramp.

Caulfield railway station is served by the Pakenham, Cranbourne, Frankston, and Gippsland lines, which are part of the Melbourne railway network. The station also connects to the Route 3 tram service and routes 624 and 900 bus services.

Description 
Caulfield railway station is on the boundary of Caulfield East and Malvern East, suburbs of Melbourne, Victoria. North of the station is Dandenong Road, and south of the station is Normanby Road. The station is located nearby to the Caulfield Village apartment and shopping complex, Caulfield Racecourse, and Monash University. The station is owned by VicTrack, a state government agency, and the station is primarily operated by Metro Trains. The adjacent stations are Malvern station up towards Melbourne and Carnegie and Glen Huntly stations down towards Dandenong or Frankston.

Designed by railway architect J. W. Hardy, the station complex was built in 1913–1914 in the Federation Free Classical style. The station consists of a single island platform and two side platforms with a total of four platform edges. Standard in Melbourne, the platform has an asphalt surface with concrete on the edges. The station has a pedestrian subway, accessed from the centre of the platforms by a ramp. In addition to the four passenger platforms, there is a horse platform which Heritage Council Victoria notes is "a rare structure of its type" although its physical characteristics are "undistinguished". The Caulfield Railway Complex has three principal station buildings, a former lamp/store room, and a signal box—all heritage listed. 

Unique architectural features in the three red brick station buildings include elaborately decorated parapets and radiating bands of render around the arched openings. Original fittings that have been retained from the 1914 station reconstruction include the timber palisade gates, timber seating, and ticket office fittings. The signal box was built around 1920. Constructed out of red brick, it has a tiled hip roof and retains its original fittings.

The station building, platform, and underpass are largely the same as when originally built, with the main changes being updated signage, technology, and the addition of two new ramp canopies, amongst other minor building and platform upgrades. There is a small 130-space car park on the south side of the station. The station is listed as an "assisted access" station on the Metro Trains website, as the access ramp is too steep and would require assistance for wheelchair customers to traverse.

History 
 
Caulfield railway station was opened on 7 May 1879, with the station consisting of a single platform and track for commuter and freight service. The first station buildings were opened on the site between 1881 and 1883 to coincide with the duplication of track between the city and Oakleigh. The current station was constructed in 1913–1914 to provide new and improved facilities for a station that was facing rapidly increasing growth. The station rebuild was part of level crossing removal works that removed all level crossings, rebuilt all stations, and quadruplicated the corridor between South Yarra and Caulfield by 1914. In late 1922, the line was electrified using 1500 V DC overhead wires, with 'three position' signalling also introduced.

The station has mostly stayed the same since 1914, with only minor upgrades taking place. In 1977, the goods yard and loading platform was closed to traffic. This platform had been used for cargo, postal, farming, and Caulfield Racecourse horse deliveries during its operational life; however, it was decommissioned after the reduction in use. In 1985, a number of sidings and their associated points and signals were abolished. The station underwent minor upgrades in 1994 and 2015–2016, and in June 1996, it was upgraded to a Premium Station. In July 2022, the signal box at the station was closed, with operations handled remotely from the Kananook signal control centre.

In conjunction with the Metro Tunnel project, Caulfield station has received upgrades to its heritage structures, platforms, ticketing facilities, and signage. These projects have been undertaken to make Caulfield station into a hub and major interchange station. Despite these upgrades, many news outlets and public transport commentators have called for more drastic upgrades to the station, including making the station fully accessible, increasing connectivity to other modes of transport, and reducing overcrowding that is often faced at the station.

Caulfield Railway Disaster 

On 26 May 1926 the 6:02pm Oakleigh-bound train crashed into the rear of a stationary train at Platform 4 of Caulfield Station, in the first fatal collision to occur on the newly electrified rail system in Melbourne. Casualties included three dead and 170 people injured. 

A highly politicised story at the time, the Coroners verdict found that "the weight of evidence is certainly against the driver in a more serious degree, and perhaps to a lesser degree against the guard." On 12 September 1926, the relieving stationmaster who had been on duty at the time of the crash, shot and killed himself on the island platform. Later that month, the court found the driver and the guard not guilty with the rider that "In the opinion of the jury, from the evidence given regarding the running of electric trains, the precautions taken to safeguard the public at this particular point are inadequate, and should be rectified immediately." 

Seven years after the fatal crash, an automatic "trip" system which cut power to trains entering a section against a signal was finally installed at Caulfield Railway Station. 

A plaque was unveiled on Platform 4 in 2011 by the Friends of Cheltenham and Regional Cemeteries to memorialise victims of the crash.

Platforms and services
Caulfield has two side platforms and one island platform with four faces. The station is currently served by Pakenham, Cranbourne, and Frankston line trains and is also served by V/Line Traralgon and Bairnsdale services. Caulfield station is served by the Pakenham, Cranbourne, and Frankston lines on the metropolitan train network and the Gippsland line on the regional V/Line network. The Pakenham line runs between Pakenham station and Flinders Street station via the City Loop. The Cranbourne line also follows a similar route, joining the Pakenham line at Dandenong before continuing to the city. The Frankston line runs from Frankston station south east of Melbourne, joining the Cranbourne and Pakenham lines at Caulfield station before continuing onto the Werribee or Williamstown lines via Flinders Street station. The station is also serviced by V/Line's Gippsland line heading up towards Southern Cross station or down towards Traralgon or Bairnsdale stations. From 2025, the Pakenham and Cranbourne lines will run via the Metro Tunnel before continuing onto the Sunbury line to Sunbury. From 2029, Airport services will stop at Caulfield station.

Platform 1:
 stopping all stations and limited express services to Flinders Street, Werribee, and Williamstown.

Platform 2:
 stopping all stations and limited express services to Frankston.

Platform 3:
 express services to Flinders Street.
 express services to Flinders Street.
 V/Line services to Southern Cross (set down only).

Platform 4:
 stopping all stations and limited express services to Pakenham.
 stopping all stations and limited express services to Cranbourne.
 V/Line services to Traralgon and Bairnsdale (pick up only)

Future services:In addition to the current services, the opening of the Metro Tunnel will link the Pakenham and Cranbourne lines to both the Sunbury line and under-construction Melbourne Airport rail link from 2025 and 2029, respectfully.
  express services to Sunbury (2025 onwards)
  express services to Melbourne Airport (2029 onwards)

Transport links
Caulfield station has one tram connection and two bus connections. The route 3/3a tram service operates from nearby Derby road up towards the city and down towards Malvern East. The station has two bus connections; route 624 from Kew to Oakleigh station and the route 900 SmartBus from Caulfield station to Stud Park Shopping Centre in Rowville. The station does not have an accessible tram platform or a bus interchange and instead is operated through on-street bus and tram stops. Caulfield station is also a major hub for train replacement bus and coach services due to the junction located east of the station. The station has numerous train replacement bus and coach stops located north and south of the station, with the ability for the southern carpark to be converted into a transfer point.

Tram connections:

 : Melbourne University – Malvern East (operates as 3a on weekends and Public Holidays)

Bus connections:
: Kew – Oakleigh station
 : to Stud Park Shopping Centre (Rowville)

References

External links
Public Transport Victoria

 

Heritage-listed buildings in Melbourne
Listed railway stations in Australia
Premium Melbourne railway stations
Railway stations in Australia opened in 1879
Railway stations in Melbourne
Railway stations in the City of Glen Eira
Federation Free Classical architecture in Australia